Gujarat Arts & Science College, popularly and previously known as Gujarat College, is one of the oldest educational institution of India and second arts and science college of Gujarat, near Ellis Bridge, Ahmedabad. The institution was founded in 1845 as a government-run educational institute. It was established as regular college in 1850, and is now under the direct management of the Education Department of Government of Gujarat.

History
Gujarat College started as a small educational institution in 1860 due to efforts of T. C. Hope, who inspired local people for charity, which led to the start of the institution. Thus the institute was started in 1860 as Gujarat Providential College but ceased to work in 1872. However, after a gap of five years it was restarted in 1879 as Gujarat College under management of the Gujarat College Committee, which at that time was under the able leader ship of local textile magnate, Rai Bahadur Sheth Ranchhodlal Chotalal. Later his grandson and philanthropist Sardar Sir Chinubhai Madhavalal Bert, ICE in 1897 came forward and donated 33 acres of land along with generous cash donations worth millions of rupees for the expansion of Gujarat College. The buildings that came up from these donations were Madhavlal Ranchodlal Science Institute named after father of Sir Chinubhai, Sydenham Library and George V Hall, which all were inaugurated by Lord George Sydenham Clarke in 1912, 1915 and 1917, respectively. The Engineer, Rai Bahadur Himmatlal Dhirajram Bhachech, who was President of Ahmadabad Municipality at that time, overlooked the construction of college buildings.
.

After Independence of India, the college continued to expand and the New Science Building was built in 1948, Tutorial Building in 1965, and Science Workshops in 1965.The Department of Dramatics was established in 1970–71.

Present status
The college houses departments of Arts faculty, departments of science and a full-time degree course in drama.  The institute also runs many undergraduate courses.

The institute is managed by the Commissioner for College and Universities under the State Department of Education.

Affiliation 
The college started with affiliation from University of Bombay, which was granted in March 1879. Later when Gujarat University at Ahmedabad came into existence it granted its affiliation to Gujarat College and since then the college is affiliated to Gujarat University.

Indian Independence Movement
Mahatma Gandhi held an historic meeting at Gujarat College campus under the presidency of V.J. Patel on 28 September 1920 and addressed a huge mass of students asking them to join Non-cooperation Movement, giving detailed description of atrocities committed by British regime on Indians. This led to many professors and students leaving college, as it was government run institution and joining Gujarat Vidyapith, which was started by Gandhi in 1920.

During the Quit India Movement in 1942, many students of college participated organizing a rally and shouting slogan against British, which led to death of one student of college named Vinod Kinariwala, who was shot dead by English policeman inside college campus, on 10 August 1942. Later in 1947, Veer Vinod Kinariwala Memorial was inaugurated by Jai Prakash Narayan in memory of his martyrdom inside college campus.

Alumni

Vinod Kinariwala - noted martyr 
Nautam Bhagwan Lall Bhatt - noted physicist 
Indulal Yagnik - noted independence activist, writer & filmmaker
Kasturbhai Lalbhai - a leading industrialist 
Ambalal Sarabhai - a leading industrialist
Umashankar Joshi - noted poet, writer 
Disha Vakani (b. 1978), television actress, who plays the role of Daya Ben, in the tele-serial, "Taarak Mehta Ka Ooltah Chashmah".
Girjaprasad Chinubhai Madhowlal - later the Sir Chinubhai Madhowlal Ranchhodlal, 2nd Baronet of Shahpur.
G. V. Mavlankar - first speaker of Lok Sabha
Nanalal Dalpatram Kavi - poet.
Vikram Sarabhai - noted scientist.
Anandshankar Dhruv.
Vidyagauri Nilkanth -author, social activist, wife of Ramanbhai Nilkanth, one of the first women graduates from Gujarat.
 Vishnuprasad Trivedi - Gujarati literary critic
Ranjitram Mehta - Gujarati author
Radheshyam Sharma - Gujarati author
R. M. Kantawala - former Chief Justice of the Bombay High Court
Uttamlal Trivedi (1872–1923)

Faculty
M.V. Rajadhyaksha - a noted Marathi writer and critic.
Prahalad Chunnilal Vaidya - an Indian physicist and mathematician.
Dhirendra Mehta - a noted Gujarati novelist, poet, commentator.
Dhirubhai Thaker- eminent critic
Anandshankar Dhruv  - a noted Gujarati scholar, writer, educationist and editor.
Gatubhai Gopilal Dhru - biographer, translator & Writer

References

Colleges affiliated to Gujarat University
Universities and colleges in Ahmedabad
Arts colleges in India
Commerce colleges in India
Schools in Colonial India
Educational institutions established in 1860
1860 establishments in British India
British colonial architecture in India